Jérémy Sinzelle (born 2 July 1990) is a French rugby union player. He plays as a centre, wing, fly-half or full-back for Toulon in the Top 14.

Career
After beginning his professional career with Toulon, and before moving to Stade Français in 2012 and La Rochelle in 2017, where he won the European Rugby Champions Cup in 2022,  he returned to Toulon at the end of 2021-22 Top 14 season.

Style of play
Sinzelle can be described as a utility back, like James O'Connor or François Steyn, being able to play from 10 to 15 and starting more than ten professional games in each position.

Honours

La Rochelle
 European Rugby Champions Cup: 2021–22

References

External links
 
Stade Rochelais (in French)

1990 births
Living people
French rugby union players
Rugby union wings
Rugby union centres
Rugby union fly-halves
Rugby union fullbacks
RC Toulonnais players
Stade Français players
Stade Rochelais players